Kareby is a locality situated in Kungälv Municipality, Västra Götaland County, Sweden. It had 292 inhabitants in 2010. Kareby IS have four sports on the programme and is reigning Swedish bandy champions for women (2016).

References 

Populated places in Västra Götaland County
Populated places in Kungälv Municipality